Riddell may refer to:

 Riddell (surname), with a list of people so named
 Clan Riddell, a Lowland Scottish clan
 Riddell baronets, three baronetcies created for people with the surname
 Riddell Sports Group, an American sports equipment company

See also
 Riddel (disambiguation)